The Battery C, 1st West Virginia Light Artillery Regiment was an artillery battery that served in the Union Army during the American Civil War.

Service
Battery C  was organized at Wheeling in western Virginia between January 25, 1862 and March 30, 1862.

Battery C was mustered out on June 28, 1865. It had a total of 173 men, with 106 enlisting from Washington County, Ohio, and 67 from West Virginia.

The 1st West Virginia Light Artillery Regiment lost 33 men, killed and died of wounds; 131 men, died of disease, accident or in prison; total deaths, 164 men. (all 8 batteries)

[Source: Regimental Losses in the American Civil War, 1861–1865, by William F. Fox]

Command Structure 
OFFICERS     Frank Buell 1st Captain (killed at Freeman's Ford, August 22, 1862)
             Dennis O'Leary  Sr. 1st. Lieut.
             Wallace Hill    Jr. 1st. Lieut. (promoted 2nd Captain, Sept. 1, 1862 vice to Buell)
             John G. Theis   Sr. 2nd. Lieut. (promoted Jr. 1st. Lieut. Sept. 1, 1862 vice to Hill)
             William W. Withrow Jr. 2nd Lieut.(promoted Sr. 2nd. Lieu. Sept.1, 1862 vice to Theis)
             Henry M. Langley (promoted from orderly sergeant to Jr. 2nd. Lt.,Sept.1,1862,vice
               Withlow)
             Wesley Miner (promoted to Jr. 2nd. Lieut., January 1, 1863, vice Withrow, resigned)
STAFF SERGEANTS
             F. G. Field   Appointed Sr. 2nd. Lieut.         1st. Sergeant
             Thomas Phelps                                    Q. M.
LINE SERGEANTS
             1. Owen O'Neil
             2. John B. Hagan  discharged  March 14, 1863
             3. Alexander H. Buckley
             4. Leonidas R. Miraben
             5. David Dow
             6. William Goldsmith
             7. Albert U. Moore  Appointed, vice to Hagan
CORPORALS
             1. Farrel Cusack
             2. William F. Minster
             3. William H. Ranger
             4. John Lehnhard
             5. Jeremiah A. Dooley
             6. James Wright
             7. John Meighan
             8. John W. Jacobs  Appointed Jr. 2d. Lieut
             9. Milton H. Laughlin
            10. George W. Stanley
            11. John N. Miner
            12. Lafayette Franks
BUGLERS
             Frank B. Brenan
             William Jenvey
ARTIFICER
             Samuel S. Patterson
             David Wagoner

CASUALTIES
            Braddock,  S.J. Killed July 2, 1863
            Bramhall,  Jos  Died March 4, 1863
            Eaton,     John Wounded Bull Run; died September 4, 1862
            Henning,   Henry Died September 13, 1862.
            Holden,    Chas. A Died November 10, 1862
            Hutchinson, Jos. T Died September 12, 1863
            Lacey,     Chas   Killed July 3, 1863
            Perry,     JNO   Died September 15, 1862
            Reynolds,  JNO   Wounded Cross Keys; discharged
            Rogers,    F. M. Died March 1, 1863
            Rogers,    M. C. Died March 7, 1863
            Steeber,   Adam   Died July 4, 1863
            Strong,    Samuel  Died August 23, 1863

References
The Civil War Archive

Notes

See also
West Virginia Units in the Civil War
West Virginia in the Civil War

Units and formations of the Union Army from West Virginia
Artillery units and formations of the American Civil War
1862 establishments in Virginia
Military units and formations established in 1862
Military units and formations disestablished in 1865